Diaeus is a genus of skipper butterflies in the family Hesperiidae. The genus was erected by Frederick DuCane Godman and Osbert Salvin in 1895.

Species
The following species are recognised in the genus Diaeus:
Diaeus ambata Evans, 1953 - Ecuador
Diaeus lacaena (Hewitson, 1869) - Costa Rica, Panama, Brazil
Diaeus variegata (Plötz, 1884) - Brazil (Rio de Janeiro), Bolivia
Diaeus varna Evans, 1953 - Mexico

References

Pyrgini
Hesperiidae genera
Taxa named by Frederick DuCane Godman
Taxa named by Osbert Salvin